Kosmos 13 ( meaning Cosmos 13) or Zenit-2 No.9 was a Soviet optical film-return reconnaissance satellite launched in 1963. A Zenit-2 spacecraft, Kosmos 13 was the eighth of eighty-one such satellites to be launched.

Spacecraft
Kosmos 13 was a Zenit-2 satellite, a first generation, low resolution, reconnaissance satellite derived from the Vostok spacecraft used for crewed flights, the satellites were developed by OKB-1. In addition to reconnaissance, it was also used for research into radiation in support of the Vostok programme.

Mission
The Vostok-2 rocket, serial number T15000-01, was used to launch Kosmos 13. The launch took place from Site 1/5 at the Baikonur Cosmodrome at 08:24:00 GMT on 21 March 1963. Following its successful arrival in orbit the spacecraft received its Kosmos designation, along with the International Designator 1963-006A and the Satellite Catalog Number 00554.

Kosmos 13 was operated in a low Earth orbit. After eight days in orbit, the spacecraft was deorbited on 29 March 1963, with its return capsule descending by parachute for recovery by the Soviet forces in the steppe in Kazakhstan. In addition to its reconnaissance payload, Kosmos 13 also carried an experiment to measure radiation levels in its environment.

See also

 1963 in spaceflight

References

Spacecraft launched in 1963
Kosmos satellites
Spacecraft which reentered in 1963
Zenit-2 satellites